Sprout is a surname. Notable people with the surname include:

 Bob Sprout (born 1941), American baseball pitcher
 Jonathan Sprout (born 1952), American singer-songwriter
 Pomona Sprout, fictional character in the Harry Potter franchise
 Tobin Sprout (born 1955), American musician